The 1st Burma Infantry Brigade was an Infantry formation of the British Burma Army during World War II. It was formed in July 1941, when it was converted from the Maymyo Infantry Brigade Area and assigned to the 1st Burma Infantry Division. In June 1942, it was redesignated 106th Indian Infantry Brigade and became part of the British Indian Army.

Formation
These units served with the brigade.
1st Battalion, Burma Rifles
5th Battalion, Burma Rifles
2nd Battalion, King's Own Yorkshire Light Infantry
2nd Battalion, Burma Rifles
2nd Battalion, 7th Rajput Regiment
1st Battalion, Cameronians (Scottish Rifles)
7th Battalion, Burma Rifles
12th Battalion, Burma Rifles
5th Battalion, 1st Punjab Regiment
1st Battalion, 4th Gurkha Rifles

References

British Indian Army brigades
Military units and formations of Burma in World War II
Military units and formations established in 1939
Military units and formations disestablished in 1945